Rifle Gap Dam (National ID # CO01692) is a dam in Garfield County, Colorado, about five and a half miles north of Rifle.

It impounds East Rifle Creek and West Rifle Creek about  feet upstream from their previous point of confluence. The dam was built for irrigation water storage, is owned by the Bureau, and is operated by the local Silt Water Conservancy District.

Recreation includes scuba diving in its clear water, fishing (for rainbow and German brown trout, walleye, perch, and smallmouth and largemouth bass, etc.), wildlife watching, boating, year-round camping, and hiking.

See also
Rifle Gap State Park
Rifle Creek

References 

Dams in Colorado
Reservoirs in Colorado
United States Bureau of Reclamation dams
Buildings and structures in Garfield County, Colorado
Earth-filled dams
Dams completed in 1967
Dams in the Colorado River basin
Bodies of water of Garfield County, Colorado